Urszula Włodarczyk (born 22 December 1965 in Wałbrzych) is a retired Polish heptathlete. She also competed briefly in triple jump in the fledgling years of the sport, and was a Polish record holder with 13.98 metres from July 1993 to July 2001.

At the 1998 Hypo-Meeting she was runner-up with a score of 6423 points.

International competitions

References
 

1965 births
Living people
People from Wałbrzych
Sportspeople from Lower Silesian Voivodeship
Polish heptathletes
Polish female athletes
Olympic athletes of Poland
Athletes (track and field) at the 1992 Summer Olympics
Athletes (track and field) at the 1996 Summer Olympics
Athletes (track and field) at the 2000 Summer Olympics
World Athletics Championships athletes for Poland
European Athletics Championships medalists
Universiade medalists in athletics (track and field)
Universiade gold medalists for Poland
Universiade silver medalists for Poland
Competitors at the 1989 Summer Universiade
Medalists at the 1991 Summer Universiade
Medalists at the 1993 Summer Universiade
Competitors at the 1998 Goodwill Games
20th-century Polish women
21st-century Polish women